Precht is a German philosophical talk show on ZDF named after the host Richard David Precht who discusses a current issue of social life with a guest from culture, science, business or politics in each episode. It is produced by Interscience Film and was first aired on September 2, 2012.

Each broadcast is 45 minutes long and recorded in a Berlin studio. The broadcast takes place on Sunday evenings between 11:30 p.m. and midnight. All episodes are repeated on 3sat. Gero von Boehm directs while Werner von Bergen is the editor.

For the television program, Precht received, along with two other award winners, the Deutscher Fernsehpreis (German Television Prize) in the category „besondere Leistungen“ ("special achievements") in 2013.

Concept 
In the very cinematic, nocturnal studio atmosphere without an audience, everything is concentrated on the two conversation partners. The topics are based on current developments in society or search for applicable knowledge on fundamental questions of human activity.

Episode list

External links 

 Precht on IMDb
 Official website (in German)

References 

German television shows
2003 in German television